WUMN-LD (channel 21) is a low-power television station licensed to Minneapolis, Minnesota, United States, serving the Twin Cities area as an affiliate of the Spanish-language network Univision. Owned by Media Vista Group, LLC, the station maintains a transmitter atop the Campbell Mithun Tower on South 9th Street in downtown Minneapolis.

History

The station began operating in 2005. In January of that year, after Equity Media Holdings's purchase of channel 13, the station was re-called WUMN-LP, to reflect its new Univision affiliation. Under Equity ownership, all of the station's operations were controlled from Equity's hub in Little Rock, Arkansas with only engineering staff in the area and no local programming outside of some reporters contributing local stories to a newscast anchored from the Little Rock hub by Independent Network News.

WUMN was sold to SP Television on June 2, 2009 in Equity's bankruptcy auction. The sale closed on August 17, 2009. SP Television reached a deal to sell WUMN to Media Vista Group on December 21, 2012.

On October 29, 2013, WUMN was granted a construction permit by the FCC to transition its broadcast signal to digital on UHF channel 17, formerly occupied by the analog signal of KTCI. At the time, WUMN was the last television station broadcasting an analog signal in the Twin Cities market. Despite Twin Cities Public Television nominally being able to hold on to virtual channel 17, they instead chose to utilize KTCI as an extension of KTCA, and also number its stations as subchannels of channel 2. This allowed WUMN-LD the use of channel 17 as their new virtual channel number. In early November 2020, WUMN moved from RF channel 17 to their new allotment on RF channel 21, displaying as 21.1.

Subchannel

News
Equity also produced Spanish-language local newscasts at 5 and 10 p.m., originating out of the company's program production center in Davenport, Iowa. On June 6, 2008, Equity discontinued local newscasts at its six Univision affiliates, including WUMN. In 2009, WUMN debuted its new local show Impacto Local, visually documenting and informing the Twin Cities community on education, politics, immigration, news, sports, culture and music events and airing on a weekly basis at 10:00 p.m. Central Time.

References

Deborah Caulfield Rybak (March 26, 2005). New at 5 and 10, news in Spanish. Star Tribune.

External links
Univision Minneapolis–St. Paul
NorthPine.com: WUMN-LP screen captures

Television stations in Minneapolis–Saint Paul
Univision network affiliates
Equity Media Holdings
Spanish-language television stations in Minnesota
Low-power television stations in the United States